"So Lonely" is a rock song performed by Australian band The Superjesus. The song was released in February 2004 as the third and final single from the band's third studio album, Rock Music (2003). The song peaked at number 45 on the Australian ARIA Singles Chart. It was the band's final release before they split with Warner Music Australia and pursued solo careers in June 2004.

Reception

Ronan Kellaghan, The ARIA Reports "Chartifacts!" writer, described "So Lonely" as, "an acoustic track lacking the edgy guitar of previous Superjesus material."

Track listing

CD Single (5046717072)
 "So Lonely" (Paul Berryman, Tim Henwood, Sarah McLeod, Stuart Rudd, Chris Tennent)
 "Life Like Before" (McLeod, Berryman, Rudd, Henwood)
 "Deeper Water" (McLeod, Berryman, Rudd, Henwood)

Charts

References

2004 singles
2003 songs
Songs written by Sarah McLeod (musician)
Warner Records singles
The Superjesus songs